The 2018 Major League Soccer All-Star Game was the 23rd edition of the annual Major League Soccer All-Star Game. It was held on August 1 at the Mercedes-Benz Stadium in Atlanta, Georgia and played against Italian club Juventus. The match was tied 1–1 after 90 minutes and was settled in a penalty shoot-out that Juventus won 5–3.

Josef Martínez won MVP.

The match was attended by 72,317, setting a new record for a standalone MLS All-Star Game.

Pre-match

In October 2017, MLS announced that Atlanta would host the All-Star Game, due to the success of the first-year Atlanta United FC. Juventus was confirmed as the match's opponents in March 2018, participating as part of their American pre-season tour.

Match rules
Unlimited substitutions
Penalty shoot-out if tied through full time; no extra time

Squads

MLS All-Stars

 (captain)

 Manager:  Gerardo Martino (Atlanta United)

Juventus

 Manager:  Massimiliano Allegri

Notes:
Injured or otherwise unable to play.

Match

References 

2018
All-Star Game
Juventus F.C. matches
Association football penalty shoot-outs
August 2018 sports events in the United States
MLS All-Star
2018 in Atlanta